is a Japanese football player for FC Imabari.

Career
After being raised by Kyoto Sanga youth ranks, Shimamura was promoted to the top team in November 2016; after one season, he was loaned to FC Gifu. On 12 February 2019, Brazilian club Londrina announced, that they had loaned Shimamura and his teammate Kota Ogino. During his time at Londrina, Shimamura didn't play any games for the first team but mostly for the U19s.

On 29 January 2020, Shimamura joined Cerezo Osaka on loan.

Club statistics
Updated to 30 August 2018.

References

External links

Profile at J. League
Profile at FC Gifu

1999 births
Living people
Association football people from Okayama Prefecture
Japanese footballers
Japanese expatriate footballers
J2 League players
Kyoto Sanga FC players
FC Gifu players
Londrina Esporte Clube players
Cerezo Osaka players
Cerezo Osaka U-23 players
FC Imabari players
Association football midfielders
Japanese expatriate sportspeople in Brazil
Expatriate footballers in Brazil